Badger is a census-designated place (CDP) in the Fairbanks North Star Borough of Alaska. It was one of the CDPs created in 2010 out of small suburbs and outskirts of Fairbanks. It has an area of 66.71 sq. mi, 65.63 of land and 1.08 of water.

The population of the CDP was 19,031 as of the 2020 Census, down from 19,482 in 2010. Badger's designation as a Place made it number 5 by population, behind Anchorage, Fairbanks, Juneau and Knik-Fairview, in a list of Alaska Cities and census-designated places (by population). Badger is a major community of the Fairbanks, AK Metropolitan Statistical Area. 

Fort Wainwright the Army and National Guard installation of Fairbanks is inside the Badger Place geographic boundaries.  The military estimates that the installation serves approximately 7,000 Soldiers and 6,500 Family Members, 2,400 Civilians and Contractors and 7,800 Retirees and Veterans. The Soldiers and Family Members are very transient but the total population number less so. A significant portion of the Badger population reported in the 2010 Census were Soldiers and Family Members of Fort Wainwright.

Demographics 

Badger first appeared on the 2010 U.S. Census as a census-designated place (CDP) with a total population of 19,482.

Sex 
For every 100 females there were 109.9 males.

Age 
 Median Age: 31.4
 Total population Under 18 years: 29.5 %
 Total population 65 years and over: 5.2 %

Households 
 Total households: 6,858
 Family households: 5,118
 Family households with own children under 18 years: 52.6 %
 Family households Husband-wife family: 4,183
 Family households Husband-wife family with own children under 18 years: 49.2 %
 Family households Female householder, no husband present: 525
 Family households Female householder, no husband present, with own children under 18 years: 69.1 %
 Nonfamily households: 1,740
 Nonfamily households Householder living alone: 1,301
 Nonfamily households Householder living alone 65 years and over: 213
 Average size House-holds: 2.84
 Average size Families: 3.25

References

Census-designated places in Alaska
Census-designated places in Fairbanks North Star Borough, Alaska